Comic Seer (Desktop) is a Freeware sequential image viewer application for Microsoft Windows and Linux used for viewing and reading Comic Book Archive files containing image formats, such as JPEG, PNG, and TIFF. Comic Seer is focused on the management of large comic book libraries, while still being a full featured comic book viewer and reader.

Features
Comic Seer's foundation is built upon CBR, CBZ, and image file viewing. This is expanded upon by an array of features supporting this, including:
 Single and dual image viewing, with automatic double-width image detection
 Zooming of images from 1-4X	
 Browsing of images in a Comic Book Archive as thumbnails
 Full-screen viewing
 Bookmarking capability
 Magnification of image areas
 Image rotation with memory
 Library organization and searching, and efficient handling of large libraries
 Comic meta-data viewing
 View multiple comic book files at one time

History and status
Comic Seer is an open-source application that was originally released in June 2012 with initial version 0.8-beta. It is currently used more than 1000 people daily. The latest version is 2.51-3. It is built on the LGPL licensed framework, Qt, for cross-platform development.

Windows App

In 2014 Comic Seer for Windows RT, 8.1, and 10 desktops and tablets was released for purchase in the Windows Store
Its features include:
 Reads CBR, CBZ, CB7 comic file archives and image files
 Supports all interface devices: mouse, keyboard, pen, touch
 Page memory
 Page rotation
 1 & 2 page viewing (with auto-detect of wide pages)
 1x-4x zoom
 Library browsing and visualization
 Library filtering
 Build your own CBZ files
 View and edit embedded comic information
 Bookmarking
 Comic Vine integration for finding comic information
 User selectable backgrounds
 Read progress indicators and filtering
 Primary and secondary live tiles
 Color correction

Operating systems
 Microsoft Windows: XP, Vista, 7, 8, 2003, 2008, 2012
 Linux: tested on Ubuntu 12.04+

References

External links
 

Image viewers
2012 software
2013 software
2014 software
Linux image viewers
Proprietary freeware for Linux
Windows graphics-related software
Graphics software that uses Qt